Khánh Hà (born 28 March 1952 in Đà Lạt) is a Vietnamese singer. Her older brother is Tuấn Ngọc.

Two of her songs appear in the film Gleaming the Cube.

Early life
Her full name is Lã Thị Khánh Hà, also known as Lữ Khánh Hà. She was born on February 28, 1952, in Da Lat. Her father, Lữ Liên is a musician. Due to the influence of her father, she and her 6 siblings later followed a career in singing and became famous singers abroad, including Bích Chiêu, Tuấn Ngọc, Anh Tú, Thúy Anh, Lan Anh and Lưu Bích.

Career
At the age of 16, Khánh Hà performed for the first time for the National Lottery event at Thong Nhat theater.

In 1969, she appeared in the "Hippies À GoGo" program organized weekly at Queen Bee discotheque on Nguyen Hue Street, Saigon. Later that year, she joined The Blue Jets band with Anh Tú and Thúy Anh.

After the events of April 30 in 1975, she migrated to the United States.

During the first few years abroad, she often performed music in French, English. Until 1980, she returned to performing Vietnamese music.

In the years 1986-1987, she organized her own music program known as "Khanh Ha Center", which was performed at Sea Palace, Tung cafe in Monterey Park. She was also one of the first singers to collaborate with Thúy Nga Center when she was performing in Paris.

Personal life
Khánh Hà got married at the age of 18. However, despite having a son together, the couple soon broke up.

In 1990, she performed in the "Hè 1990" (Summer of 1990) event held by Tô Chấn Phong and Lưu Huỳnh. It was on this occasion that she and Tô Chấn Phong got to know each other. Since then, they have lived together until today. The two had a child.

References

External links
 Khánh Hà Productions official website 

20th-century Vietnamese women singers
1952 births
Living people
People from Da Lat
Vietnamese Roman Catholics
Vietnamese emigrants to the United States